Out of This World is an American fantasy sitcom about a teenage girl who is half alien, which gives her unique superhuman powers. It first aired in syndication from September 17, 1987 and ended on May 25, 1991.

During its first season, the series was originally part of NBC's Prime Time Begins at 7:30 campaign, in which the network's owned-and-operated stations would run first-run sitcoms in the 7:30-8 p.m. time slot to counter-program competing stations' game shows, sitcom reruns and other offerings. Out of This World was rotated with the original series Marblehead Manor and She's the Sheriff, a syndicated revival of the 1983 sitcom We Got It Made, and a television adaptation of the play You Can't Take It with You. NBC ended the experiment after the 1987–88 season due to the low ratings put up by three of the series, with Out of This World being one of the two that were renewed (the other being She's the Sheriff).

After its first season, Out of This World began airing primarily on weekends. Despite receiving mostly negative reviews from critics, it lasted three more seasons.

Show summary
The series revolves around Evie Ethel Garland - a young girl who discovers on her 13th birthday that her father Troy is an alien from the planet Antares Prime, in the Scorpio Galaxy. Evie's half-alien heritage gives her superhuman abilities, with most of the episodes revolving around Evie misusing her powers and causing some trouble which she spends the rest of the episode fixing. Only Evie and her family know about the alien side; many episodes depict their efforts to hide her secret from other characters. After four seasons, the series ended on a cliffhanger: Troy came to visit and Donna took his place by accident, ending up on Antares Prime while Troy was stranded on Earth.

Characters
 Evie Ethel Garland (Maureen Flannigan) — Evie is a half-human, half-alien girl who lives with her mother in Marlowe, California (a fictional analogue of Carmel-by-the-Sea), in a house overlooking the sea. She is an only child. Evie attends a school for gifted children (run by her mother) and achieves good grades there. Her mother had always told Evie that her father was a secret agent, but on her 13th birthday Evie developed superhuman abilities; it was then revealed that her father is a native of another planet. Evie's most frequently-used power is her ability to freeze time on Earth by touching her index-fingertips together; this allows her to alter the course of Earthly events by maneuvering herself and/or others as desired. When she claps her hands together, time resumes as normal. She can also "unfreeze" individuals by touching them while time is frozen. She later gains the power to gleep, which allows her to manifest objects using only her mind. Her father describes her as "the perfect child: loving; caring; with the same needs of most teenagers". The series follows Evie through her teenage years, from her 13th birthday in the pilot to her 18th birthday in the final episode. Although she was the leading character, Flannigan was billed last in the credits. In the first season, she received the billing "And Introducing Maureen Flannigan". Starting with the second season, she received a different billing: "And Maureen Flannigan as Evie".
 Donna Froelich-Garland (Donna Pescow) — Evie's mother. Described by her husband as "an ambitious working mother with a career", Donna runs a school for gifted children, which Evie attends. She later founds her own catering company, "Donna's Delights". Toward the end of season 3, Donna becomes the mayor of Marlowe. Donna is very protective of her daughter, often to the dismay of Evie, who would like to be more independent. Donna, along with her brothers Beano and Mick, are the only regular characters on the show who know Evie's secret.
 Troy Garland (Burt Reynolds, voice only) — Evie's father. Troy is a human-looking extraterrestrial, with many special powers, from the distant world of Antares Prime. He is an astronaut where he comes from. Troy met Donna when his spacecraft crashed on Earth at some point in the late 1960s or early 1970s. The two fell in love and were married in 1971; two years later, Donna gave birth to Evie. The year after that, Troy was recalled to participate in a war which raged on Antares. Since then, Troy occasionally visits Earth... staying in touch with his daughter via a special communication device known as the "cube" (see below). Troy's powers seem practically unlimited; although he lives on Antares Prime, he can control many things on Earth - from computers to the weather. He can also give and/or take away Evie's powers at will (as demonstrated in the second episode of the series); and is very good at keeping up with events on Earth. While Troy appears in the show's opening credits, he rarely makes a physical appearance — and when he does, his face is obscured (for example, via a surgical mask or shadows). In the series finale, when Troy arrives on Earth, he is seen in a silhouette with stars from the galaxy. Troy was credited as "himself" in the opening credits from Season Two onwards.
 Beano Froelich (1987–1991) (Joe Alaskey) — "Beano", Evie's uncle on her mom's side of the family, lives next door to her and his sister Donna. Beano has a large appetite and runs a diet clinic known as "Waist-a-Weigh", which is later renamed after him. Beano is one of the two regular characters who know Evie's secret, Donna being the other. He last appears in season 4, episode 12.
 Kyle Applegate (Doug McClure) — Kyle is a former television actor who is now the mayor of Marlowe. Kyle is a good friend of the family, but "the mayor" punishes even the smallest offenses. As well as being egocentric and vain, Kyle is dimwitted and gullible, often completely failing to notice Evie's "alien" antics. He clings to his former TV glory as the star of "Mosquito Man" and many long forgotten mainly Western movies. Towards the end of season three, Kyle is appointed police chief by Donna, who takes over from him as mayor.
 Buzz (Buzz Belmondo) — The manager of Beano's diet clinic, and one of the more eccentric characters in town. Buzz usually makes one brief appearance per episode, during which he performs a series of puns and/or prop-based gags...sometimes related to the elaborate costume that he is wearing. He speaks with an unknown accent, and is prone to bizarre behavior. Donna sometimes resorts to him for help, more often than not regretting it.
 Lindsay Selkirk (Christina Nigra) — Evie's best female friend. She and Evie spend a lot of time together drinking milkshakes at their local diner, the "Goodie Goodie." Lindsay is Evie's confidante when it comes to boys and her non-Antarean related problems.
 Chris Fuller (Steve Burton) — Chris is a surfer and high school student who later enrolls at Marlowe Community College. He is introduced as a new student and good basketball player in the season one episode "Evie Get Your Basketball". Chris becomes Evie's boyfriend, although they are more like brother and sister; sometimes they even date other people. In Season Four, Chris says Evie was and always will be his girl.
 Quigley Handlesman (Carl Steven) (1987-1988) - One of Evie's classmates at Donna's school for the gifted.
 Phil (John Roarke) (1987–1988) - The jovial, funny handyman who works on the Garlands' house during the first season. He is always snooping around in the family's business; Donna, Evie, and Beano constantly scramble to keep Phil from suspecting Evie's alien heritage.
 Jeffrey Cummings (Tony Crane) (1990) - A high school classmate of Evie and Lindsay's who transfers in during their senior year. Incredibly handsome, basically picking where Chris left off after going to college, Jeffrey soon begins dating Evie...who is forced to juggle her relationships with him and with Chris. 
 Peter (1990–1991) (Peter Pitofsky) — A waiter at the Goodie Goodie who is introduced in the first episode of Season Four. He is a clumsy, goofball Antarean who provides his own brand of comic relief whenever Evie and her friends stop by the restaurant. He was military intelligence for Antares until he chose to stay on Earth, his memory erased of all Antarean things. He has a penchant for misinterpreting people's orders, and sometimes even forgets his own name.
 Mick Froelich (1990–1991) (Tom Nolan) — Donna's brother and Evie's uncle, who was introduced in season 4, episode 7, to replace Uncle Beano as a recurring character. He is a former rock musician.

The Cube
Evie was able to communicate with Troy through a special laser genetic communication device known as the "cube," which he gave to her when she turned 13. The cube effectively functioned as a telephone line to Antareus — it could even be used to leave Troy an "answerphone" message, as seen in the episode "My Little Evie." There were no controls on the cube; Evie simply would call for her father, and the cube would activate when he answered, and deactivate when he would "hang up." Depending on the plotline, Troy would manifest his powers while talking through the cube, emitting a beam of energy directly from the cube.

Evie and Donna would normally keep the cube around the house, out of sight (often in Evie's bedroom), sometimes telling people it was an ornament, a talking clock, a toaster radio/phone, or a candy dish, amongst other common household items. When the cube was activated, the top half of it would open up on a hinge with a magenta light pulsing inside, with a "spacey" sound effect. The ambient lights in the room would usually dim as well. Troy's voice would be heard clearly through the cube with reverberation.

Originally, even though everyone was able to hear Troy through the cube, Evie was the only one whom Troy could hear, as the cube was described to be "genetic." This changes in the first episode of season 2, "Evie's Birthday Wish." At the end of the episode, Evie uses her final wish to request that her mother be able to talk to Troy as she can. As a result, Troy could then hear Donna and they could talk back and forth. It was unknown whether the rest of Evie's family could also talk to Troy, but there were other aliens that Troy could hear through the cube, as seen in Season 4 Episode 5 "Evie's Guardian Angel" (an Antaerian was sent to Earth to protect Evie and Donna, and he could speak to Troy via the cube).

Guest stars
The series featured several celebrities who made cameo appearances on the show, occasionally as themselves. In chronological order of appearances:

 Ann Miller
 Norman Fell (as Evie's psychiatrist Dr. Hauser, "The Nightmare", 1987)
 Scott Carpenter (as himself, "Evie and the Young Astronauts", 1987)
 Charles Nelson Reilly (as himself, "Dueling Mayors", 1987)
 Betsy Palmer (as Donna's mother, "Uh, Oh... Here Comes Mother", 1987 and “AKA Dad”, 1987)
 Tom Bosley (as Troy's father, "Guess Who's Coming to Earth", 1988 and "Around the World in Eighty Minutes", 1989)
 Jamie Farr ("Go West, Young Mayor", 1988)
 Richard Kiel (as Norman, "Go West, Young Mayor", 1988)
 Scott Baio (who also directed several episodes) made a cameo appearance in "Princess Evie" (1988) and "Evie Goes For the Gold" (1989)
 Lyle Alzado ("Goodbye Mr. Chris", 1990)
 Mr. T ("New Kid on the Block", 1990)
 Susan Anton ("Best Friends", 1990)
 Tiffany ("I Want My Evie TV", 1990)
 Florence Henderson ("My Mom, and Why I Love Her")
 Kathleen Freeman (as Miss Ogilvy, Evie's high school teacher, "Educating Kyle", 1991)

Episodes

Season 1 (1987–88)

Season 2 (1988–89)

Season 3 (1989–90)

Season 4 (1990–91)

Opening credits
The opening credits for the series incorporated special effects footage from the 1979–1981 series Buck Rogers in the 25th Century. The theme song is a modified version of "Swinging on a Star". Video snippets of parents Donna and Troy show the start of their relationship including the wedding and birth of daughter Evie. Troy's face is continuously obscured, never fully shown. The fictional town of Marlowe is shown to be adjacent to Carmel-by-the-Sea, California and Monterey, California with a directional traffic sign.

International airings
In France, Out of this World was aired under the name Loin de ce monde (Far From this World) as part of a block called La Une est à vous (The Front Page is Yours) from September 10, 1988 until October 12, 1991 then from July to August 1992 on TF1. It was then rebroadcast from November 1994 until November 10, 1996 on M6.

In Germany, Out of this World was aired under the name Mein Vater ist ein Außerirdischer (My Father is an Alien) which aired on RTL Plus in 1989.

In Italy, Out of this World was aired under the name Cose dell'altro mondo (Things from the Other World) on Rai 1 from 1990. This was also the name of a comedy film from 2011.

Out of This World was first broadcast in the UK on the ITV network on April 9, 1990, until 1995.

Critical reception
Discussing Out of This World, Roger Fulton stated "like many juvenile US sitcoms, the series was short on laughs and long on moralizing". The book Television Without Pity contained a review of Out of This World that described the show as "quite possibly the worst sitcom ever made-it's a complete failure on every level". The review went on to criticize the show's scripts, acting and production, and unfavorably compared Out of This World to Sabrina the Teenage Witch. The Splitsider website called Out of This World "perhaps the worst sitcom ever, or at least the most '80s sitcom ever".

Home media
A DVD set with 35 episodes from seasons 1 and 2 was released in Germany on November 8, 2011. The 6-disc set has a runtime of 875 minutes, but does not include all episodes due to music rights. The DVD has an option in the last menu to switch the audio from German to English.

In other media
 In the Universal Studios ride Kongfrontation, the news report that plays during the queue is interrupted by an ad for Out of This World, at which the screen crawl at the bottom of the ad is a civil defense message warning that King Kong is in the vicinity and for civilians to stay indoors and not use public transportation until further notice.
 The show was parodied in the Robot Chicken episode, "Executed by the State". In the parody, Evie (voiced by Kat Dennings) is asked out by a boy who likes her, she uses her powers to stop time and takes a look down his pants in order to check out the size of his penis. After seeing the size of his penis, Evie says "Uhhh, pass." This is followed by canned laughter typical of sitcoms of that era. Evie then walks off with time still frozen.

Stations
As previously mentioned, during the first season, Out of This World aired on NBC's owned-and-operated stations as part of their Prime Time Begins at 7:30 experiment.

References

External links

Out of This World opening credits at YouTube

1980s American comic science fiction television series
1980s American teen sitcoms
1987 American television series debuts
1990s American comic science fiction television series
1990s American teen sitcoms
1991 American television series endings
American fantasy television series
English-language television shows
First-run syndicated television programs in the United States
Television series about families
Television series about teenagers
Television series by Universal Television
Television shows set in Los Angeles